Igreja da Cidade is a Baptist Evangelical multi-site megachurch based in São José dos Campos in Brazil. It is affiliated with the Brazilian Baptist Convention and Baptist World Alliance.  Its main pastor is Carlito Paes. The church often achieves an attendance of up to 14,000 people.

History

The church was founded in 1942 under the name of Igreja Evangélica Batista de São José dos Campos.  In 1982, she was renamed Primeira Igreja Batista em São José dos Campos. 
Since 2003, it hosted a show about the life of Jesus Christ for Easter which takes place every year.   In 2013, the church inaugurated a new campus with two auditoriums including one with 6,000 seats, a sports complex, restaurants, offices and an elementary and secondary school, Colégio Inspire.  In 2015, it had opened 9 campuses in different cities of Brazil and took its current name Igreja da Cidade. In 2020, it achieved 14,000 members.

Beliefs 
The Church has a Baptist confession of faith and is a member of  the Brazilian Baptist Convention.

See also
List of the largest evangelical megachurches
List of the largest evangelical church auditoriums

References

External links
 

Baptist churches in Brazil
Evangelical megachurches in Brazil
Baptist multisite churches
1942 establishments in Brazil